Unishe April is a 1994 Indian Bengali-language drama film directed by Rituparno Ghosh and produced by Renu Roy under the banner of Spandan Films. It stars Aparna Sen and Debashree Roy while Prosenjit Chatterjee and Deepankar De appear in supporting roles. The music of the film was composed by Jyotishka Dasgupta.

Unishe April marked Ghosh's second directorial venture after Hirer Angti (1992). A loose remake of Ingmar Bergman’s film Autumn Sonata (1978), it opened to widespread acclaim, with critical praise drawn towards the screenplay and performances by the lead actors—especially that of Sen and Ray, the latter eventually winning the National film Award for Best Actress. Ghosh, besides directing the film, also wrote the screenplay while the cinematography was handled by Sunirmal Mazumdar.

The film's narrative revolves around the tensed relationship between a woman who is an uninvolved parent and her daughter, depicting how their inter-personal matters lead to a bitter aspect of life. Considered way ahead of its time, the huge success of the film was instrumental in ending the era of action films in Bengali film industry and rejuvenating the genre of art films. Ray's award-winning performance further consolidated her position as the 'undisputed queen of Bengali cinema'. At the 42nd National Film Awards, it won Best Feature Film and was nominated for the New Currents Award at the Busan International Film Festival of 1996.

Plot 
Sarojini (Aparna Sen) is a well-known dancer, whose immense dedication to her art permeates every aspect of her life. While honor and acclaim make way into her professional life she, is less successful on the domestic front. Her growing popularity leads to her husband Manish's (Boddhiswatta Majumdar) gradual resentment towards her and ultimately a rift between the couple. Manish takes over the upbringing of their only daughter, Aditi, as Sarojini remains busy with her artistic commitments. Sarojini seems to find a replacement for the void in her marital life through dancing, however she is unsure if her blossoming career and success is really bringing her happiness. The sudden demise of Manish forces Sarojini to put her daughter in a hostel. The glittering memory of her father and her mother's inability to give her proper time results in Aditi's  bitterness towards her mother.

The film begins with Aditi's (Debashree Roy) returning home. She is now all grown up and on the verge of starting her career as a doctor, like her father. The atmosphere is thick with the sharp tension between mother and daughter. Shortly after Aditi's return, Sarojini is honored with a prestigious award. It is 19 April, Aditi's father's death anniversary, which her mother appears to have forgotten. Misunderstanding and temperamental conflicts creates an air of suffocation for both.

Aditi's prospective husband, Prosenjit Chatterjee dumps her after his family learns of her mother's profession soon after the public announcement of Sarojini's award. Heartbroken, Aditi decides to attempt suicide, which her mother finds out leading mother and daughter into a heart-to-heart conversation. Gradually they unlock two decades of rage and rancor, pain and bitterness to each other. Untold facts finally get deciphered, misunderstandings clear out. All hint to the final question: "Will Aditi ultimately be able to forgive her mother?"

Cast 
The cast is listed below:

Aparna Sen as Sarojini Gupta (Babli)
Debashree Roy as Dr. Aditi Sen (Mithu)
Deepankar De as Somnath
Chitra Sen as Bela
Prosenjit Chatterjee as Sudeep
Boddhiswatta Majumdar as Manish Sen

Direction 

Rituparno depicts the embittered relationship between mother and daughter with utmost care. The daughter's indifference to her mother's activities, friends and students are woven in with naturalistic dialogues. Scenes depicting Sarojini's celebration of her success on her husband's death anniversary, Aditi's refusal to take part in the celebrations, her lack of knowledge of her mother's intimate, everyday details (including a recurring knee pain) help the audience gain an understanding of their relationship. Ghosh's realistic cinematic style explore psychological realms of the two women through smartly composed dialogues and controlled acting. Movement through time is depicted through smooth transitions between the past and the present, which effectively reflect the character's state of mind. Debashree Roy and Aparna Sen both shine in their respective roles.

Legacy

Unishe April gained cult status in Bengali cinema, and has been considered as one of the most memorable works of Ghosh. Critics cited that "it changed the dynamics of Bengali cinema". According to the film-based website , owing to Unishe April, "Ghosh’s reputation as a niché filmmaker spread far and wide and he would continue to make films on one interesting subjects after the other, pushing the envelope of his creative and cinematic liberties." In the words of Shubhra Gupta from The Indian Express:

Following its success, Ghosh came to be known as the "Heir to Satyajit Ray" as he derived from Ray's style "a subtler way of telling complex problems that plugged Bengali society" in [almost] all his films. Noted socialist  hailed Unishe April to be a pertinent example of the fact that "good family relations grow from negotiation and discussion". While elaborating further, she says "Ghosh demonstrates that motherhood is not only something that needs to be worked at but that traditional expectations made of women in modern society are unrealistic in this respect." Sangeeta Dutta pinpoints that the film helped Ghosh to build his reputation among the Bengali diaspora. On 22 July 2021, Shoma. A. Chatterji has written "Through this very unusual film, Ghosh aspired to free the censored and distorted image of the screen mother from the taboos and constraints of patriarchal culture, to place it as a subject of psychological study and sociological inspiration for a feminist reading." Film-maker Goutam Ghoshe noted "the mother-daughter relationship in 'Unishe April' was refreshing, yet realistic in a society that was going through churning."

Debashree Roy, who was already a popular actress in Bengali cinema, gained critical acclaim for this film in particular. She went on to collaborate with Ghosh in his yet another venture Asukh (1999), which was too a success. The film tops the list of her Best Performances, and in one of her interviews she was quoted saying, "this character is very much different from the ones I have played till now". Talking about Sen's role in the film, The Times of India has put forth their view as, "Aparna Sen excelled in her role. Both the personality of a professional dancer and motherly love has superbly bloomed in the character Sarojini". As part of  Indian Independence Day's celebration in 2016, NDTV included the film in its "70 Great Indian Films" listing. News18 considered it to be one of the "100 Greatest Indian films of all time".

Awards

Notes

References

External links 

1994 films
1994 drama films
Bengali-language Indian films
Films featuring a Best Actress National Award-winning performance
Films set in Kolkata
Best Feature Film National Film Award winners
Films directed by Rituparno Ghosh
Indian drama films
1990s Bengali-language films